Muhammad Pasha al-Azm was the Ottoman governor of Sidon Eyalet (1763–1770) and Damascus Eyalet (1771–72 and 1773–83). He was a member of the prominent al-Azm family, the son of a former governor As'ad Pasha al-Azm. 

During Muhammad Pasha's time in office, Damascus was experiencing a peak in its prosperity, although its political clout in the Levant was being overshadowed by the rulers of Acre, first Zahir al-Umar and then Jezzar Pasha. Muhammad Pasha administered the city well and commissioned numerous building projects. Among the new constructions were the Abdullah al-Azm Madrasa near the Azm Palace, and the Suq al-Jadid (New Market) between the Suq al-Arwam and the Citadel of Damascus. He married off one of his daughters to Jezzar Pasha which was intended to signify an alliance between the two governors, although they remained rivals nonetheless. 

Muhammad Pasha's death in 1783 largely marked the end of the al-Azm family's political dominance in Ottoman Syria, although the family continued to be influential well after the end of Ottoman rule in 1917. Muhammad Pasha's son, Abdullah Pasha, was the last governor of Damascus from the al-Azm family.

References

Bibliography

 
 

1783 deaths
Ottoman governors of Damascus
Muhammad
Ottoman governors of Sidon
18th-century people from the Ottoman Empire